Phoceanidae is a family of bryozoans belonging to the order Cheilostomatida.

Genera:
 Phoceana Jullien, 1903
 Sertulipora Harmelin & d'Hondt, 1992

References

Cheilostomatida